Glyphidocera Novercae is a pale brownish yellow moth discovered in Costa Rica in 2005 by David Adamski. A member of the Autostichidae family the moth was located at 5 collection sites. G. Novercae (From Latin Noverca: stepmother) differs from Glyphidocera tibiae (Tibia: meaning reed pipe) also discovered by Adamski at similar collection sites. G. tibiae however has an absence of sex scales between abdominal terga 2-3 in the male and other differing attributes.

References

Moths described in 2005
Taxa named by David Adamski
Glyphidocerinae
Moths of Central America